The Shire of Mundaring is a local government area in eastern metropolitan Perth, the capital of Western Australia.

History
The Greenmount Road District was created on 17 April 1903. On 29 March 1934, it was renamed the Mundaring Road District. On 1 July 1961, it became the Shire of Mundaring following the passage of the Local Government Act 1960, which reformed all remaining road districts into shires.

Statistics
Mundaring Shire has published the following statistics for the period 1994-2006:
 Population: 35,097
 Area: 643.32 km²
 Rateable area: 205.91 km²
 Rateable properties: 15,251
 Revenue: A$50.1M
 Vested reserves: 104.60 km²
 Forests and National Parks: 238.30 km²

Wards
The shire is divided into four wards.

 West Ward - three councillors
 South Ward - three councillors
 Central Ward - three councillors
 East Ward - three councillors

National Parks
The Shire contains three national parks and numerous nature reserves:
 Beelu National Park
 Greenmount National Park
 John Forrest National Park
 Lake Leschenaultia
 Mundaring Weir and Interpretation Precinct

Trails

The Shire is recognised for its natural environment and has numerous walk and ride trails:
 Bibbulmun Track
 C Y O'Connor Trail
 Eagle View Walk Trail
 Forsyths Mill Mountain Bike Track
 Kep Track
 Lake Leschenaultia Trails
 Munda Biddi Trail
 Railway Reserves Heritage Trail
 Weir View Walk

Suburbs and localities
The suburbs and localities of the Shire of Mundaring with population and size figures based on the most recent Australian census:

Population

Presidents and chairmen

Heritage-listed places

As of 2023, 143 places are heritage-listed in the Shire of Mundaring, of which 26 are on the State Register of Heritage Places, among them John Forrest National Park, Lake Leschenaultia and the Swan View Tunnel.

See also
 2014 Perth Hills bushfire
2021 Wooroloo bushfire

References

External links
 

 
Mundaring